Sunfest is an annual Canadian festival of food, culture, art, and music that takes place in London, Ontario, Canada, in July. The festival venue is Victoria Park and is typically held the weekend after Canada Day. During Sunfest, music from various cultures is performed on the main bandstand in the park and 4 other stages. The rest of the park is covered with craft vendors selling their goods. A key part of the festival is the large number of food stands selling foods from all different ethnic backgrounds. In 2014, Sunfest attracted more than 275,000 visitors.

External links
 Sunfest official website
 Video - Past Performances

References

Music festivals established in 1994
World music festivals in Canada
Music festivals in Ontario
Festivals in London, Ontario
1994 establishments in Ontario